Babineaux may refer to:
 Jonathan Babineaux, a former American football defensive tackle
 Bri (Briana Babineaux), an American urban contemporary gospel artist
 Jordan Babineaux, a former American football safety
 Kathleen Babineaux Blanco, the 54th Governor of Louisiana
 Ricky Babineaux, an American male former track and field sprinter
 Huell Babineaux, a fictional character in Breaking Bad and Better Call Saul